The Wollaton Antiphonal is an illuminated manuscript currently held in the collection of the University of Nottingham.

History
The manuscript was in use at St. Leonard's Church, Wollaton from the 1460s, until Catholic Latin service books were banned in the Reformation in the 1540s. The antiphonal was kept safe in Wollaton Hall library until 1924, when it was returned to the church.  In 1974 it was put in the care of the University of Nottingham.

References

External links
 Conservation project

Documents of the Catholic Church
1430s books
15th-century Latin books